Palagama Grama Niladhari Division is a Grama Niladhari Division of the Homagama Divisional Secretariat  of Colombo District  of Western Province, Sri Lanka .  It has Grama Niladhari Division Code 599.

Palagama is a surrounded by the Welmilla, Kidelpitiya West, Ambalangoda, Heraliyawala and weniwelkola  Grama Niladhari Divisions.

Demographics

Ethnicity 

The Palagama Grama Niladhari Division has a Sinhalese majority (98.9%) . In comparison, the Homagama Divisional Secretariat (which contains the Palagama Grama Niladhari Division) has a Sinhalese majority (98.1%)

Religion 

The Palagama Grama Niladhari Division has a Buddhist majority (97.6%) . In comparison, the Homagama Divisional Secretariat (which contains the Palagama Grama Niladhari Division) has a Buddhist majority (96.2%)

Grama Niladhari Divisions of Homagama Divisional Secretariat

References